The Dassaretae may refer to the:
 Dassaretii, an Illyrian tribe
 Dexaroi, a Chaonian tribe